The League Cup was a knock-out competition for British rugby league football clubs between 1971 and 1996.

It was initially for professional clubs with the exception of two amateur teams who were finalists of the BARLA National Cup. However, in the latter seasons the cup was expanded to include leading amateur and French teams, the latter as a precursor to their inclusion in the Challenge Cup. The rounds were played during the early part of the season, with the final taking place usually in January. The tournament was regarded as much less prestigious than the Challenge Cup, and it was abandoned when Rugby League moved to be a summer sport.

Although officially called the League Cup, the name of the competition was always referred to by its sponsorship name. The initial sponsors were the tobacco manufacturer John Player & Sons with Regal taking over in 1989 until the competition's end. Over the years, the competition was known as the Player's No.6 Trophy (1971–77), the John Player Trophy (1977–83) and the John Player Special Trophy (1983–89), before finally becoming the Regal Trophy in 1989.

List of finals

Originally the 1980 Final was scheduled to be played at Station Road Swinton but a cold snap meant that the final was postponed and switched to Headingley

See also

References

External links

 
Rugby league competitions in the United Kingdom
1971 establishments in the United Kingdom
1996 disestablishments in the United Kingdom
Recurring sporting events established in 1971
Recurring sporting events disestablished in 1996